André Dufraisse (30 June 1926 – 21 February 2021) was a French cyclo-cross cyclist, who was a professional from 1950 to 1964.

Career
Dufraisse won the World Cyclo-cross Championships five times from 1954 to 1958, and was the French national champion seven times between 1955 and 1963. Dufraisse switched to cyclo-cross after finishing second in the 1953 world championship and from then on dominated the sport - in 1956 he won 19 of the 20 races he entered.

Dufraisse died in February 2021.

References

1926 births
2021 deaths
French male cyclists
Cyclo-cross cyclists
Sportspeople from Haute-Vienne
UCI Cyclo-cross World Champions (men)
Cyclists from Nouvelle-Aquitaine